The Special number 3 light tank Ku-Ro (特三号戦車 クロ) (also known as the "So-Ra") was an experimental Japanese winged light tank project, developed during World War II.

History and development
In the Fall of 1943, the Imperial Japanese Army's Teishin Shudan formed the 1st Glider Tank Troop. Before the 1st Glider Troop was established, the only heavy support available to Japan's airborne infantry was provided by the Kokusai Ku-8. This military glider was able to transport the Type 94 and Type 94 75 mm mountain guns, but these infantry support guns lacked the mobility and anti-tank capabilities required by Japan's paratroopers. The solution to this problem was to develop a glider-portable light tank, but the existing Ku-8 glider was not capable of supporting the weight of a vehicle as large as a tank. So in 1943 and into 1944 the Armoured Army Headquarters (army aviation headquarters) and the Fourth Army Institute of Technology collaborated on a new concept to fill this role, a flying tank. A small tank that could be towed on a glider by a powered aircraft and then released and glide down to the battlefield along with paratroopers. The tank would detach its wings after landing and then be able to provide armour support to the infantry. Rather than using an existing tank or glider design, it was decided that a new tank and new glider should be developed. Work on developing the glider was given to Maeda Iron Works Company, while designing and building of the prototype was given to Mitsubishi.

Design
Mitsubishi based the tank on their Type 98 Ke-Ni light tank. The weight was reduced to 2.9 tons from 7.2 tons and the crew was brought down from 3 to 2. A single prototype was built and named the "Special number 3 light tank Ku-Ro". The commander sat in the turret and acted as both gunner and loader. The driver's position was located in the chassis. The turret was rear-mounted and housed the tank's only weapon, a Type 100 37 mm tank gun, the same used by the Ke-Ni. There was no coaxial or hull mounted machine gun. There were plans to mount either a flamethrower or 7.7 mm Type 97 machine gun in place of the tank's 37 mm gun. The glider developed for the Ku-Ro was the Maeda Ku-6 a 700 kg twin boom craft that was specially designed to fit the tank. When mounted in the Ku-6 glider, the Ku-Ro had a wingspan of 22 m, a length of 12.8 m and a total weight of 4.2 tons. The glider was designed to be towed behind a Mitsubishi Ki-21 medium bomber. The tracks of the tank were unable to match Ki-21's take-off and landing speeds and since taking-off and landing would cause a great amount of damage from friction to the tracks, a pair of detachable skis were made part of the glider. The glider, after being launched and landing could quickly be disassembled and removed from the Ku-Ro tank.

By 1945 the project was cancelled. This was caused by a combination of technical problems, related to the poor manoeuvrability of the glider and stress on the tank, and the changing nature of the war for Japan. The Pacific War was going poorly for Japan by 1944. The Japanese had lost air supremacy to the United States Air Force and the chances of any large Japanese aircraft towing a glider being intercepted and shot down were very high and would mean not only the loss of the aircraft but the tank, as well. As with many innovative weapons projects launched by Japan in the final years of the war, production could not advance beyond the prototype stage due to material shortages, and the loss of Japan's industrial infrastructure to the Allied bombing of Japan.

See also

Winged tank
Antonov A-40
Light Tank Mk VII Tetrarch
Japanese tanks of World War II
List of engines and weapons used on Japanese tanks during World War II
List of Japanese armoured fighting vehicles of World War II

Notes

References
 木俣滋郎『幻の秘密兵器 恐るべき先駆的技術の集大成』廣済堂出版 1977年（後に光人社NF文庫から再版 1998年 ）

External links
Historic Wings
Taki's Imperial Japanese Army Page - Akira Takizawa

Light tanks of Japan
Number 3 Ku-Ro
Experimental and prototype tanks
History of the tank